Buranda is a neighbourhood in the southern Brisbane suburbs of Greenslopes and Woolloongabba in Brisbane, the capital of Queensland, Australia.

The location is an important transport hub for southern Brisbane. Logan Road and Ipswich Road pass through the area as does the South East Busway with a station called Buranda busway station.  The Pacific Motorway passes through the area. There is also the Buranda railway station on the Cleveland railway line.

The Centro Buranda Shopping Centre is located at Buranda.

Heritage listings 
Buranda has the following heritage-listed sites:
 24 Cowley Street: Buranda State School

Future development
Buranda is set to become one of the many transit-oriented development (TOD) Locations across Brisbane. The proposed TOD is to include 2 office buildings of 6 storeys and 23-storeys, five apartment buildings ranging from seven-storeys to the 32-storey and a 15-storey boutique hotel. The TOD is being named Buranda Village.

See also

 TransApex
 Transport in Brisbane

References

External links

Buranda.com - Information about Buranda
University of Queensland: Queensland Places: Buranda

Brisbane localities